Martin Fous (born January 14, 1987) is a Czech professional ice hockey goaltender. He is currently playing for EHC Wolfsburg in the Deutsche Eishockey Liga (DEL).

References

External links

1987 births
Living people
Grizzlys Wolfsburg players
Czech ice hockey goaltenders
People from Šumperk
Sportspeople from the Olomouc Region
Czech expatriate ice hockey players in Germany
Kassel Huskies players
EHC Klostersee players
Hamburg Freezers players
Schwenninger Wild Wings players
ESV Kaufbeuren players
Naturalized citizens of Germany
EHC Freiburg players